The 1932–33 Toronto Maple Leafs season was the team’s 16th season in the National Hockey League (NHL).

Regular season

Final standings

Record vs. opponents

Schedule and results

Player statistics

Regular season
Scoring

Goaltending

Playoffs
Scoring

Goaltending

Playoffs

The Maple Leafs met the Boston Bruins in the second round in a best of five series and won 3–2. In the finals, they lost to the Rangers in a best of five series 3–1.

New York wins best-of-five series 3–1.

Awards and records
 King Clancy, Defense, Second Team NHL All-Star
 Charlie Conacher, Right Wing, Second Team NHL All-Star
 Busher Jackson, Left Wing, Second Team NHL All-Star
 Dick Irvin, Coach, Second Team NHL All-Star

Transactions
January 3, 1933: Acquired Bill Thoms from the Boston Bruins for Harold Darragh

See also
 1932–33 NHL season

References
 Maple Leafs on Hockey Database

Toronto Maple Leafs seasons
Toronto
Toronto